Mark Hutchinson may refer to:

 Mark Hutchinson (cricketer) (born 1978), Irish cricketer
 Mark Michael Hutchinson, American actor
Mark Hutchinson (businessman) (born 1960), Former GE Executive and CEO of GE Europe

See also
 Mark Haigh-Hutchinson (1964–2008), English video-game developer
 Mark Hutchison (born 1963), Lieutenant Governor of Nevada